General elections were held in Italy on 23 November 1890, with a second round of voting on 30 November. The "ministerial" left-wing bloc emerged as the largest in Parliament, winning 401 of the 508 seats. As in 1886, the election was held using small multi-member constituencies with between two and five seats.

Background
Francesco Crispi was appointed Prime Minister on 29 July 1887. True to his initial progressive leanings he moved ahead with stalled reforms, abolishing the death penalty, revoking anti-strike laws, limiting police powers, reforming the penal code and the administration of justice with the help of his Minister of Justice Giuseppe Zanardelli, reorganising charities and passing public health laws and legislation to protect emigrants that worked abroad. He sought popular support for the state with a programme of orderly development at home and expansion abroad.

His desire to make Italy a colonial power led to conflicts with France, which rejected Italian claims to Tunisia and opposed Italian expansion elsewhere in Africa. One of his first acts as premier was a visit to the German chancellor Otto von Bismarck, whom he desired to consult upon the working of the Triple Alliance. Basing his foreign policy upon the alliance, as supplemented by the naval entente with Great Britain negotiated by his predecessor, Robilant, Crispi assumed a resolute attitude towards France, breaking off the prolonged and unfruitful negotiations for a new Franco-Italian commercial treaty, and refusing the French invitation to organize an Italian section at the Paris Exhibition of 1889.

Crispi and his Treasury Minister Giovanni Giolitti knew of an 1889 government inspection report about the Banca Romana, which had loaned large sums to property developers but was left with huge liabilities when the real estate bubble collapsed in 1887, but feared that publicity might undermine public confidence and suppressed the report. Forsaken by his Radical friends, Crispi governed with the help of the right until he was overthrown by Antonio Di Rudinì in February 1891, who was succeeded by Giovanni Giolitti in May 1892.

Parties and leaders

Results

References

General elections in Italy
Italy
1890 elections in Italy
Italy